Sinéad Farrington  is a British particle physicist who works on the ATLAS experiment at the Large Hadron Collider.

Farrington is interested in B physics, Higgs physics, tau physics, and long-lived particles. She is a Professor of Physics at the University of Edinburgh. In December 2020 Farrington was named the physical sciences and engineering laureate for the Blavatnik Awards for Young Scientists in the United Kingdom 2021.

Early life and education
Farrington was born in Torphins, Aberdeenshire, Scotland, to John Farrington, a Professor of Geography at the University of Aberdeen, and Bernadette, a primary school teacher. She has one younger brother Conor. She attended St Margaret's School for Girls in Aberdeen before studying physics at the University of Edinburgh. She remained in Scotland for her doctoral research, moving to the University of Glasgow. Her research was on a measurement of the lifetime of the strange B meson as part of the Collider Detector at Fermilab (CDF) collaboration.

Research and career
After completing her doctorate, Farrington joined the University of Liverpool as a research Fellow and whilst based at Fermilab co-led the CDF team that first established matter-antimatter oscillations in the B⁰_s system. Farrington went on to hold an Science and Technology Facilities Council (STFC) advanced fellowship at the University of Oxford and a junior Kurti fellowship at Brasenose College, Oxford. In 2011 she joined the department of physics at the University of Warwick where she set up her own research group on ATLAS. During this period she co-led the team on ATLAS that measured the decay of the Higgs boson to tau leptons establishing for the first time a Yukawa coupling of a scalar Higgs to fermions. She moved to the University of Edinburgh in 2018.

She has also held a CERN associateship, is a senior experimental fellow at the Institute for Particle Physics Phenomenology at Durham University and is a visiting professor at the University of Oxford. She was awarded a European Research Council consolidator grant in 2018, to develop triggers and analysis techniques to allow searches for long-lived particles decaying to tau particles at the Large Hadron Collider.

Since 2019, Farrington has been the Principal Investigator (spokesperson) for the 15 UK institutes  on the ATLAS collaboration.

Recognition
In  2020 Farrington was named the Blavatnik Awards for Young Scientists Faculty Winner for the United Kingdom.  She was elected to the Fellowship of the Royal Society of Edinburgh in 2022.

Selected publications

References

Year of birth missing (living people)
Living people
People from Aberdeenshire
Alumni of the University of Glasgow
Alumni of the University of Edinburgh
Academics of the University of Liverpool
Academics of the University of Edinburgh
Fellows of Brasenose College, Oxford
Academics of the University of Warwick
People associated with CERN
British women physicists
Particle physicists
Fellows of the Royal Society of Edinburgh